These are the most popular given names in the United States for each respective year in the 1970s.

References 
 Most Popular 1000 Names of the 1970s from the Social Security Administration

1970s
1970s in the United States